Vitaliy Butrym (Ukrainian: Віталій Бутрим; born 10 January 1991) is a Ukrainian sprinter specialising in the 400 metres.

Career
He represented his country at the 2012 Summer Olympics without advancing from the first round. He also competed in one indoor and two outdoor World Championships.

His personal bests in the event are 45.01 seconds outdoors (Almaty 2015) and 46.45 seconds indoors (Istanbul 2018). Both are the current national records.

International competitions

References

External links

1991 births
Living people
Ukrainian male sprinters
Olympic athletes of Ukraine
Athletes (track and field) at the 2012 Summer Olympics
Athletes (track and field) at the 2016 Summer Olympics
World Athletics Championships athletes for Ukraine
Sportspeople from Sumy Oblast